Alfréd Fehérvári (Grédinger) (18 November 1925 – 30 March 2007) was a Hungarian football player (as midfielder) and, later, coach. He began his football career with Moson Kühne. Between 1945 and 1947, he played in Integrál-DAC, and from the autumn of 1947 to 1960, Győri ETO FC. He retired in 1960, with around 13 seasons as a footballer. Between 1970 and 1972, he was head coach at Szombathelyi Haladás, coaching 67 games. He was, for two years, the department head for Győri ETO FC. He died in 2007. 

His grandson, Freddie, is a Hungarian singer and the representative for Hungary in the Eurovision Song Contest 2016.

Championships
 Nemzeti Bajnokság I: 1952, 1953

Sources
NB I Football statistics from the National Archive pages
Fehérvári as coach
Fehérvári's obituary

1925 births
2007 deaths
Hungarian footballers
Association football midfielders
Győri ETO FC players
Integrál-DAC footballers
Nemzeti Bajnokság I players
Footballers from Vienna